Power Play is the tenth studio album by the Canadian rock band April Wine, released in 1982 (see 1982 in music).
Music videos were made for the singles "Enough Is Enough", "If You See Kay", and "Tell Me Why". Power Play failed to meet the critical acclaim of the band's previous album, but the single "Enough Is Enough" managed to reach #50 on the Billboard Hot 100, spending 8 weeks on the chart. The album itself peaked at #37 on Billboard's 200 Album chart, remaining there for 20 weeks.

Track listing
All tracks written by Myles Goodwyn unless otherwise noted.
 "Anything You Want, You Got It" – 4:45
 "Enough is Enough" – 4:04
 "If You See Kay" (David Freeland) – 3:51
 "What if We Fall in Love" – 4:22
 "Waiting on a Miracle" – 4:06
 "Doin' it Right" (Tom Lavin) – 3:43
 "Ain't Got Your Love" – 4:31
 "Blood Money" – 5:22
 "Tell Me Why" (John Lennon, Paul McCartney) – 3:16
 "Runners in the Night" – 5:15

Personnel
 Myles Goodwyn – vocals, guitars, keyboards
 Gary Moffet – guitars, background vocals
 Steve Lang – bass, background vocals
 Brian Greenway – vocals, guitars
 Jerry Mercer – drums

References

April Wine albums
1982 albums
Aquarius Records (Canada) albums
Capitol Records albums
Albums produced by Mike Stone (record producer)
Albums produced by Myles Goodwyn